Kekaya was an ancient Indo-Aryan tribe of north-western South Asia whose existence is attested during the Iron Age. The members of the Kekaya tribe were called the Kaikayas.

Location
The Kekayas were located between the Gāndhāra kingdom and the Vipāśā river, more precisely on a tributary of the Irāvatī river named the Saranges by ancient Greek authors.

The capital of Kekaya was a city named Rājagṛha or Girivraja, identified with the modern-day Girjak or Jalalpur in the Pakistani Punjab.

History
The Kekeyas, as well as the neighbouring Madraka and Uśīnara tribes, were descended from the Ṛgvedic Anu tribe which lived near the Paruṣṇī river in the central Punjab region, in the same area where the Kekayas were later located.

During the 6th century BCE, the Kekayas, along with the Madras, Uśīnaras, and Sibis, fell under the suzerainty of the Gāndhāra kingdom, which was the principal imperial power in north-west Iron Age South Asia.

Later history
The 10th century CE  of Rājaśekhara  furnishes a list of the extant tribes of his times which also includes the Kekayas along with the Shakas, Tusharas, Vokanas, Hunas, Kambojas, Vahlikas, Vahlavas, Limpakas, Tangana, Turukshas, referring to them all as the tribes of Uttarapatha or north division.

A branch of the Kekaya seems to have migrated to southern India in later times and established its authority in Mysore country.

In epic literature

In the former, the step-mother of the god Rāma and mother of the prince Bharata is the eponymous princess of Kekaya, Kaikeyī.

References

Further reading

Geographical Data in Ancient Puranas, 1972, Dr M. R. Singh

India as Known to Panini, Dr V. S. Aggarwala
Ancient Geography of India, A. Cunningham

Ancient peoples of Pakistan